St. Peters Church is an historic Catholic church that is located at 60 S. Mulberry Street in Mansfield, Ohio.

It was built in 1911 and added to the National Register of Historic Places in 1979.

The church falls under the Roman Catholic Diocese of Toledo, whose current bishop is the Most Reverend Daniel Thomas.

References

Roman Catholic churches completed in 1911
Churches in the Roman Catholic Diocese of Toledo
Churches on the National Register of Historic Places in Ohio
Romanesque Revival church buildings in Ohio
Mission Revival architecture in Ohio
Churches in Richland County, Ohio
National Register of Historic Places in Richland County, Ohio
Churches in Mansfield, Ohio
20th-century Roman Catholic church buildings in the United States